State Route 274 (SR 274) is a two-lane east–west state highway located in the western portion of the U.S. state of Ohio.

Route description
State Route 274 traverses portions of Auglaize, Mercer, Shelby and Logan Counties.  No portion of State Route 274 is included within the National Highway System, a system of highways determined to be most important for the economy, mobility and defense of the nation.

History
State Route 274 was designated in 1930.  It was originally routed between State Route 66 in New Bremen and what was originally designated State Route 69 (now State Route 235) near Russells Point.  In 1937, the highway was extended on both ends, on the west to its current western terminus at U.S. Route 127 west of Chickasaw, and on the east to its current eastern endpoint at State Route 273 northeast of Rushsylvania.

Major intersections

References

External links

 State Route 274 Endpoint Photos

274
274
274
274
274